Le Bas Ségala (literally The Lower Ségala) is a commune in the department of Aveyron, southern France. The municipality was established on 1 January 2016 by merger of the former communes of La Bastide-l'Évêque, Saint-Salvadou and Vabre-Tizac.

See also 
Communes of the Aveyron department

References 

Communes of Aveyron
Populated places established in 2016